Stephen A. Rippy (born 1975) is an American composer.

Life and career
Rippy grew up in the Spring area of Harris County, Texas, and now resides in Plano, Texas, near Dallas. Making video game music was not Rippy's original career goal. He attended the University of Texas in the early 1990s to study visual art, and only took a few music courses.

Rippy worked for Ensemble Studios as the head of the Audio department with friend and collaborator Kevin McMullan. He is best known for his sound design and scores on the Age of Empires series, its spin-off Age of Mythology, and the Xbox 360 strategy game Halo Wars.

Ensemble was closed down shortly after the release of Halo Wars. Rippy joined Zynga Dallas (then Bonfire Studios), a development studio formed from ex-Ensemble employees and led by Rippy's brother David.

References

External links
Interview with Rippy, Music4Games
Article on Age of Empires music (archive), Film Score Monthly
Scoring ''Age of Mythology, IGN
Official Site

American male composers
21st-century American composers
Video game composers
1975 births
Living people
People from Spring, Texas
People from Plano, Texas
Ensemble Studios people
21st-century American male musicians